Erin Bell (born 30 April 1987) is a former Australian netball player. 

Bell's career started in 2005 with the Sydney Swifts in the Commonwealth Bank Trophy. She was the first player in the history of the ANZ Championship to win three premierships; the first with the New South Wales Swifts in 2008 and the second and third with the Adelaide Thunderbirds in 2010 and 2013.

ANZ Championship
Erin Bell played with the NSW Swifts for the first two years of the ANZ Championship. Unhappy with the amount of court time she received, she moved to the Adelaide Thunderbirds in 2010. She helped secure a premiership for the Thunderbirds, playing at GA in the Grand Final. Bell remained with the Thunderbirds for the remainder of the ANZ Championship and took over as captain for the 2016 season.

Super Netball
In 2017 Bell re-signed with the Adelaide Thunderbirds in the new Suncorp Super Netball league and was reappointed captain. Bell led the Thunderbirds to a disappointing season, finishing last on the ladder. She left the Thunderbirds at the end of the season to join the Collingwood Magpies, where she filled an important goal attack/shooter role alongside Caitlin Thwaites. Bell announced her retirement from professional netball at the end of the 2018 season.

Australian Diamonds
Bell made her international debut for the Australian Netball Diamonds during the 2011 Netball World Cup in Singapore. However she did not play in the Final against the Silver Ferns. She played a pivotal role in earning Australia the 2011 Constellation Cup title, replacing Nat Medhurst at GA during the third and deciding match in Melbourne. After not making the Commonwealth Games team in 2014, she was selected to co-captain the Australian Fast5 team later that year at the Fast5Netball World Series in Auckland. Bell worked her way back in to the Diamonds squad ahead of the 2015 Netball World Cup in Sydney. She again was selected for the Fast5 team in 2016.

References

External links
Netball Australia profile
Collingwood Magpies profile

1987 births
Living people
New South Wales Swifts players
Adelaide Thunderbirds players
Collingwood Magpies Netball players
Australia international netball players
Manchester Thunder players
Suncorp Super Netball players
Sydney Swifts players
Victorian Netball League players
Australia international Fast5 players
South Australian Sports Institute netball players
New South Wales Institute of Sport netball players
Netball players from New South Wales
2011 World Netball Championships players
2015 Netball World Cup players